Marquis is a customized 1956 Ford built by Bill Cushenbery in 1963-1965.

Built for Gene Boucher, Cushenbery started with a '56 Ford hardtop.  It was sectioned , and had almost every body panel reworked, with the hood given an asymmetrical peak; '59 Buick rear quarter panels were also added.

Candy gold paint was done by Don Mathews and Naugahyde interior by Bill Manger.

Begun in 1963, it took two and a half years to complete.

Featured appearances 
Rod & Custom, April 1962
Hot Rod, May 1962
Car Craft, June 1962
Popular Customs, Spring 1963
Car Craft, February 1963
Popular Customs, January 1966
Classic & Customs, July 1983
Custom Rodder, March 1998

Notes

Sources 
Mauldin, Calvin. "Bill Cushenbery:  Custom Creations for the Future", in Rod & Custom, December 1998, p. 84.

External links 
 Kustomrama 

Modified vehicles
Automotive styling features
One-off cars
Ford vehicles
1950s cars
1960s cars
Kustom Kulture
Individual cars